is a passenger railway station located in the city of Ōamishirasato, Chiba Prefecture Japan, operated by the East Japan Railway Company (JR East).

Lines

Station layout
Nagata Station has a two opposed side platforms connected to a one-story station building by a footbridge. Unattended for many years, the station has been attended during normal working hours since April 1996.

Platform

History
Nagata Station was opened on 20 March 1959 as a station on the Japan National Railways, after a petition signed by 2,470 local inhabitants. It joined the JR East network upon the privatization of the Japan National Railways (JNR) on 1 April 1987.

Passenger statistics
In fiscal 2019, the station was used by an average of 973 passengers daily (boarding passengers only).

Surrounding area
 
Mizuho Elementary School

See also
 List of railway stations in Japan

References

External links

  JR East Station information 

Railway stations in Japan opened in 1959
Railway stations in Chiba Prefecture
Sotobō Line
Ōamishirasato